Flekkefjords Budstikke was a Norwegian newspaper, published in Flekkefjord.  It was started in 1874 and went defunct in 1890.

See also
Norwegian newspapers

References

1874 establishments in Norway
1890 disestablishments in Norway
Defunct newspapers published in Norway
Flekkefjord
Norwegian-language newspapers
Publications established in 1874
Publications disestablished in 1890
Mass media in Vest-Agder